Winfield Alexander Garnett (born July 24, 1976) is a former American football defensive tackle. He played college football at Ohio State. Professionally, he played in the National Football League, NFL Europe, and the Arena Football League.

From 2010 to 2015, Garnett was the defensive line coach at Ohio Dominican University.

References

1976 births
Living people
People from Harvey, Illinois
American football defensive linemen
Ohio State Buckeyes football players
Barcelona Dragons players
Amsterdam Admirals players
Minnesota Vikings players
Philadelphia Soul players
Grand Rapids Rampage players
Dallas Desperados players
Players of American football from Chicago
Florida Bobcats players
Ohio Dominican Panthers football coaches
Sportspeople from Chicago